John Row was a Scottish historian.

John Row may also refer to:

John Row (poet) (born 1947), English storyteller
John Row (MP) for Totnes
John Row (Australian politician) (1905–1993), member of the Queensland Legislative Assembly

See also
John Rowe (disambiguation)
John Roe (disambiguation)